Rohan Rao, who goes by the name vopani, is an Indian sudoku and puzzle solver, widely considered as the best sudoku solver of India. He is the reigning Indian Sudoku Champion and Times of India Sudoku Champion. Rao has won 18 national championships, an all-time record, and has been one of the best Indians at the World Sudoku Championship (WSC), World Puzzle Championship (WPC) and Asian Sudoku Championship (ASC). He won the Indian Sudoku Championship nine times, in 2010, 2011, 2012, 2016, 2017, 2018, 2019, 2020, 2021 the Indian Puzzle Championship five times, in 2010, 2011, 2012, 2015, 2017, and the Times National Sudoku Championship four times, in 2012, 2015, 2016, 2019.

Rao was ranked 3rd in ASC 2021, 23rd in WSC 2019 and 39th in WPC 2019. He stood 8th in the World Sudoku Championship 2012 to become the first Indian to be ranked in the top-10 in the World in Sudoku. He stood 3rd at the Asian Sudoku Championship 2018 to become the first Indian to finish on the podium of an international WPF Sudoku Championship. He finished 3rd again at ASC 2019 and improved his performance with a 2nd-place finish at ASC 2020.

He was the director of the World Sudoku Championship 2017 and core organizer of World Sudoku and Puzzle Championship 2017 held in October, 2017 in Bengaluru, India. As part of his puzzling career, Rao has authored and organized various puzzle and sudoku championships, events and workshops across India and the world.

Championships

Indian Sudoku Championship  
Rao won his first Indian Sudoku Championship title in 2010, beating veteran solvers Ritesh Gupta (three-time and defending champion), Rishi Puri and Gaurav Korde in the finals to become the youngest ever national champion at the age of 19 years, 9 days. Since then he has won eight more times, making him the most successful player in the tournament.

He finished on the podium for 12 consecutive years (2010-2021). No other player has finished on the podium for more than 4 consecutive years.

Indian Puzzle Championship 
Rao won his first Indian Puzzle Championship title in 2010, pipping veteran solver Rajesh Kumar to become the youngest ever national champion at the age of 19 years, 240 days. Since then he has won four more times, matching Kumar's tally of 5 titles.

Asian Sudoku Championship 
The Asian Sudoku Championship was first held in 2018 where Rao stood third. He finished on the podium for four consecutive years with his 3rd-place in 2019, 2nd-place in 2020 and 3rd-place in 2021.

Career statistics

National Championships 
18 Gold, 7 Silver, 7 Bronze

Ranks in the Indian Sudoku Championship, Indian Puzzle Championship, and Times Sudoku Championship.

Asian Championships 
4 ASC Appearances

Ranks in the Asian Sudoku Championship (ASC)

World Championships 
11 WSC Appearances, 11 WPC Appearances

Ranks in the World Sudoku Championship (WSC), World Puzzle Championship (WPC)

See also 
 Indian Sudoku Championship
 Asian Sudoku Championship
 World Sudoku Championship

References 

IIT Bombay alumni
Sudoku solvers
Sportsmen
Indian sportsmen
